African communalism refers to the traditional way rural areas of Africa have been functioning in the past. In Africa, society existed for decades without formal hierarchies, with equal access to land and river for all, in a way that resembles forms of egalitarianism and socialism. Some elements of this way of life, persist till present days.

African communalism is a moral doctrine that also values human dignity, rights, and responsibilities, according to philosopher Polycarp Ikuenobe. Ikuenobe argues that, "African communalism does not necessarily see a conflict between individuals and community; they are mutually supportive, and people are required to have the moral attitude of contributing to the community for their own well-being. This attitude creates the priority of duty, which is for the fundamental goal of creating a community, in order to provide the material conditions for actualizing individuals’ substantive rights and well-being."

There have been philosophical challenges to this conception of African Communalism: philosopher Olúfẹ́mi Táíwò argues that current conceptions of African communalism are notorious for their "murkiness," and that more sophisticated conceptions of this philosophy are needed to justify its prevalence in modern philosophical discourse. In addition, Táíwò asserts that current conceptions of African communalism do not accurately reflect current political climates in Africa, and more modern philosophies are needed to guide that continent in the twenty-first century. 

The term communalism was coined by libertarian philosopher Murray Bookchin.

References 

Social anthropology
African society